Typhoon Alice was an unusual West Pacific tropical cyclone that caused extensive damage in the Marshall Islands in January 1979. Alice then began to move erratically through the Marshall Islands, causing heavy rainfall and gusty winds that destroyed crops throughout the archipelago. Nuclear cleanup operations on Enewetak in the wake of postwar nuclear tests there were disrupted, with repair of cleanup facilities lasting several months. The damage toll was estimated at between US$50,000–$500,000.

After January 6, Alice strengthened into a typhoon and took a westward course, strengthening to its peak intensity with winds of 125 mph (205 km/h) two days later. A weakening trend began thereafter as the storm tracked south of Guam on January 10, prompting thousands to evacuate to shelters though ultimately causing minor damage. After passing the island Typhoon Alice reintensified to a secondary peak intensity before strong wind shear induced rapid weakening, resulting in the storm's dissipation on January 15.

Meteorological history

The disturbance was segmented into two components directly north and south of the equator. Initially, the Joint Typhoon Warning Center (JTWC) believed that the disturbance's placement near the equator meant further storm development was unlikely. However, the system progressively organized and was classified as a tropical depression by the Japan Meteorological Agency (JMA) by 12:00 UTC on December 31. The JTWC followed suit in the upgrade twelve hours later, and soon after declared a tropical cyclone formation alert at 03:00 UTC on January 1, 1979. Tracking towards the northwest, atmospheric conditions became more favorable for intensification farther from the equator. The tropical depression became sufficiently organized to be named Tropical Storm Alice by the JTWC at 18:00 UTC that day. Over the next several days, Alice meandered through the Marshall Islands without much change in strength, steered by a transient shortwave trough.

The trough's influence soon abated, allowing a nearby ridge of high pressure to restrengthen and induce a westerly bearing to Alice's motion that would continue for five days. Alice strengthened into a typhoon on January 6 and continued to intensify thereafter, reaching a peak intensity on January 8 with maximum sustained winds of 125 mph (205 km/h) and a minimum central pressure of 930 mbar (hPa; 27.46 inHg). An area of wind shear southeast of Guam, described by the JTWC as a "frontal shear-line", slowed Alice's movement on January 9. A region of cooler and drier air north of this region was entrained also into the storm, causing Alice to lose some organization and weaken further. Two days later, a second trough over eastern Asia resulted in Alice curving north. During this trek, the typhoon restrengthened and reached a secondary peak intensity with winds of 115 mph (185 km/h) on January 11, with satellite imagery indicating robust outflow. However, this second peak was short-lived as Alice's circulation began to vertically decouple in the face of strong wind shear, exacerbated by Alice's low-level circulation  moving directly into the westerly wind flow aloft. The typhoon degenerated into a tropical storm on January 13 and weakened further into a tropical depression 18 hours later; these remnants dissipated by January 15.

Preparations, impact, and aftermath

In its earlier stages of development, Alice passed near several of the Marshall Islands. At the time, nuclear waste cleanup operations were ongoing at Enewetak Atoll following the United States' postwar nuclear tests there. On January 4, storm preparations were ordered for military assets on the atoll, beaching boats, evacuating cargo ships, and securing buildings. Most personnel stationed at Lojwa Camp were evacuated to Enewetak Camp. Rough surf at Kwajalein damaged breakwaters and piers. Significant shoreline damage occurred along the lagoon-facing shores of the Kwajalein Missile Range, compounded by Alice's nearly stationary movement. 

The damage was worst at Enewetak Camp and minor at Japtan and Lojwa Camps on the atoll. A water tower was blown down and sheet metal was torn from the roofs and walls of buildings. Some buildings collapsed due to the winds. Large rocks were washed onto the runway at Enewetak Auxiliary Airfield. Storm surge inundated the Mid-Pacific Research Laboratory grounds under  of water and washed out roads. A few boats, including a Landing Craft Utility and LCM-8, sustained minor damage. The storm cut off all power, forcing nuclear waste cleanup crews on the atoll to use emergency generators. "Extensive" damage was reported in Majuro, the capital of the Marshall Islands, and crops were destroyed throughout the archipelago. One person suffered minor injuries at Enewetak, and the damage toll was estimated at between US$50,000–$500,000. Population density and species richness of the sea snail genus Conus decreased as a result of the typhoon. Alice's presence also disrupted U.S. Coast Guard search and rescue operations for a missing sailboat with two onboard, preventing search planes from departing out of Kwajalein Atoll. U.S. President Jimmy Carter declared the Marshall Islands a disaster area, with federal disaster assistance activated for eight atolls. Initial recovery efforts following Alice at Enewetak lasted three weeks and cost over $264,000, while longer-term repair and replacement of nuclear cleanup facilities lasted several months.

With Typhoon Alice expected to track near Guam, the island's civil defense force was placed on alert. All schools were closed aside from 20 used as shelters, housing thousands of evacuees. The United States Navy evacuated a submarine tender and submarines from the island. The United States Air Force was evacuated 14 B-52 bombers and five tanker planes from Andersen Air Force Base to Kadena Air Force Base in Okinawa.

See also

Other systems named Alice
List of near-Equatorial tropical cyclones
Typhoon Hester (1952) – a similar strong typhoon that formed in December and persisted into January.
Typhoon Mary (1977) – an erratic typhoon that formed in December 1977 before striking the Philippines in January 1978

References

1979 Pacific typhoon season
Typhoons in the Marshall Islands
Typhoons in Guam